Octavian Alexandru Popescu (born 5 November 1985) is a Romanian former professional footballer who played as a goalkeeper, mainly for CS Mioveni and FC Argeș Pitești. First match Liga I was played for CS Mioveni, against ASA 2013 Târgu Mureș.

External links
 
 

1985 births
Living people
Sportspeople from Pitești
Romanian footballers
Association football goalkeepers
Liga I players
Liga II players
LPS HD Clinceni players
CS Mioveni players
FC Argeș Pitești players